Massimo Franciosa (23 July 1924 – 30 March 1998) was an Italian screenwriter and film director. He wrote for more than 70 films between 1955 and 1991. He also directed nine films between 1963 and 1971. He was nominated for an Oscar for Best Screenplay for The Four Days of Naples in 1964.

Selected filmography

 Wild Love (1955)
 Poveri ma belli (1957)
 Ladro lui, ladra lei (1958)
 Everyone's in Love (1959)
 Ferdinando I, re di Napoli (1959)
 The Magistrate (1959)
 The Assassin (1961)
 La bellezza di Ippolita (1962)
 The Four Days of Naples (1962)
 The Leopard (1963)
 White Voices (1964)
 Three Nights of Love (1964)
 El Greco (1966)
 Last Moments (1974)
 The Voyage (1974)
 I'm Photogenic (1980)

External links

1924 births
1998 deaths
20th-century Italian screenwriters
Italian male screenwriters
Italian film directors
Writers from Rome
20th-century Italian male writers
Cannes Film Festival Award for Best Screenplay winners